The 1997 Tour de Hongrie was the 26th edition of the Tour de Hongrie cycle race and was held from 22 to 27 July 1997. The race started and finished in Budapest. The race was won by Zoltán Bebtó.

General classification

References

1997
Tour de Hongrie
Tour de Hongrie